As in many other countries with a French colonial heritage, law enforcement in Benin was a responsibility primarily shared by a gendarmerie and a police force. Since January 2018, the Republican Police of Benin is the unique law enforcement force.

Former forces
The National Police was under the jurisdiction of the Ministry of the Interior, Public Security and Religious Affairs (MISPC). The country was divided into six directions départementales. Police training was conducted at the national police school in Cotonou. The  had both military and police roles. Due to its military status, the gendarmerie answered to the Ministry of Defence. It was headquartered in Porto-Novo. As a police force, it has administrative and judiciary police powers. It operated both in territorial units, responsible for defined areas, and mobile units. Overall, it had jurisdiction in nearly 90% of the country's territory.

Other forces
In addition to the police, law enforcement is provided by several forces, including customs (les Douanes), game wardens (les Eaux et forêts) and the Unité mixte de contrôle des conteneurs (UMCC).

Joint container inspection unit
The 'Unité mixte de contrôle des conteneurs includes staff from the Police, Douanes, and Eaux et forêts. Stationed in the harbour of Cotonou, it inspects containers in order to prevent the shipping of prohibited items such as drugs, weapons and counterfeit goods.

References

Sources
 World Police Encyclopedia, ed. by Dilip K. Das & Michael Palmiotto published by Taylor & Francis. 2004,  
 World Encyclopedia of Police Forces and Correctional Systems,second edition,  Gale., 2006
 Sullivan, Larry E. Encyclopedia of Law Enforcement. Thousand Oaks: Sage Publications, 2005.